Pearse railway station or Dublin Pearse is a railway station on Westland Row on the Southside of Dublin, Ireland. It is Ireland's busiest commuter station and second busiest station overall (behind Dublin Connolly railway station) with 9 million passenger journeys through the station in 2016.

Services
All DART services stop at the station.  Additionally Pearse is on the South Eastern Commuter (Dublin Connolly to Gorey) and South Western Commuter (Grand Canal Dock to Newbridge) routes, and is a terminus for the Northern Commuter (to Balbriggan / Dundalk) and Western Commuter (to Maynooth / Longford) services.  It also services the InterCity (from Dublin Connolly to Rosslare Europort) route.

Facilities
The station has two through platforms, 1 and 2, the former on the Boyne Street side for northbound "up" services towards Connolly station, the other on the Pearse Street side for southbound "down" services towards Bray. It also has a café and public toilets.

The southbound entrance (Pearse Street and Trinity BioScience) is open from 7:00 AM to 7:30 PM daily from Monday to Friday, and on Saturdays from 9:00 AM to 6:00 PM, in addition to the main entrance on Westland Row, which is open all during station opening hours. The ticket office is open from 7:30 AM to 9:50 PM, Monday to Sunday.

History

Origins
The station building originated from a design by Charles Blacker Vignoles. As the lines from the south were elevated above street level, tracks were laid on the first floor of the building.  The initial covering chosen for the passenger station was a two-span structure covering the platforms as far as Cumberland Street. It was designed to facilitate the arrival and departure of trains every 15 minutes.

The station opened for service traffic on 17 December 1834 as Westland Row Station, the city terminus of the Dublin & Kingstown Railway (D&KR), serving  and the West Pier Kingstown Harbour.

The precise details of the original 1834 trackwork may be uncertain, but a diagram from 1835 shows three platformed tracks each terminating in linked  connecting turntables and a non-platformed carriage siding, all set well back from Westland Row entrance.  The arrivals road and platform were nearest to Merrion Square.  This was in common with most platforms until the 1870s of the low-level continental style.  On the other side of the arrivals track was an island platform which was the only means of access to a train on the next track.  The island platform was of a raised height design and was accessed by a lower-able drawbridge ramp from the arrivals platform.  The departure track was on the side of the middle line of pillars supporting the two-span roof that extended as far as Cumberland Street. The track was serviced by a departure platform that allowed separate access for first class passengers at the southern end of the train. The final track was a siding on the Pearse Street side of the station. The station entrance from Westland Row contained two sets of stairs to the upper platform level.  There was also a (horse-drawn) cab entrance and ramp to the far end of the arrival platform which would have been convenient for first-class passengers.

By then Dublin and Wicklow Railway (D&WR) had taken over operations from the D&KR and trains were able to run over the course of the old Dalkey Atmospheric Railway through to connecting at Shanganagh junction with the line from Harcourt Street to Bray.

Patronage grew to 4.5 million passengers per annum in the late 1870s with powers and land obtained for the enlargement of the station. A turntable existed at the end of the line which could enable an engine to draw away from its train, turn, and proceed up the other line if the station was empty.

There ensured various alterations in the 1880s including the replacement of the roof and thereafter had four platforms and five tracks, later becoming five platforms.  The main span covered the two long platforms where the tracks were later to be extended northbound and two southbound bay platforms one to each side of them. There was also a roof span to the southwest which covers a smaller southbound bay platform.

The ownership of the station remained with the D&KR until the amalgamation to Great Southern Railways in 1925. During the interim period, the main operating company the D&WR changed its name to Dublin, Wicklow and Wexford Railway (DW&WR) in 1860 and Dublin and South Eastern Railway (DSER) in 1907.

1891 rebuild as a through station
The station was extensively rebuilt for the opening of the City of Dublin Junction Railway in 1891. During this process, the station was converted into a layout through the station with three terminus platforms that were to remain unchanged until the early 2000s with the northeast bay filled in towards the end of that period. Some DW&WR suburban trains started working through to Amiens Street and boat trains and mail could subsequently be worked round to Broadstone and Kingsbridge.

An 1893 and 1924 diagram show the platforms numbered as follows:
 A bay southbound platform in the smaller canopy on the Merrion Square side.  The 1893 diagram shows the platform as the same size as platform 2, the 1924 diagram shows it as shorter.
 A bay southbound platform in under the main canopy.
 The 'down' though platform which is now platform 1 generally used for southbound trains.
 The 'up' though platform which is now platform 2 generally used for northbound trains.  The 1893 diagram shows this shorter than platform 3.
 A bay southbound platform under the main canopy.  The 1893 diagram shows this bay of a long length, in the 1924 diagram it is shown as the same length as platform 2.

Former services
Prior to 1936 the station handled commuter services and boat trains.  In January 1937, the station took over services to Sligo, Westport and Galway over the Midland and Great Western Route via Mullingar, which were transferred to Pearse (then Westland Row) in 1934 with the closure of Broadstone Station on the north side of the Liffey. Great Southern Railways (GSR) facilitated this by installing colour light signalling in 1937 allowing reversible working for the main platforms. These express trains used platform 4 as the departure and arrivals platform which was convenient for the boat trains which generally ran into platform 5. On occasion the train for Galway train would be driven engine-first into platform 5 and the passengers loaded; it would then reverse out and pass through the station on platform 3.  Services running south of Bray on the ex-DSER route to Wicklow, Arklow, Wexford and Rosslare also operated out of Westland Row, though the principal terminus for that route was, for many years Harcourt Street station until 1959.

The upgrading of the Portarlington to Athlone branch in the mid-1970s saw Westport and Galway trains transferred to Heuston station, whilst Sligo and Rosslare trains were retimed to originate and terminate at Connolly station. A very small number of passenger services to Heuston or its mainline continued to pass through Pearse station until the about the time of the closure of the Dún Laoghaire pier branch around 1989.

Station renaming
The station was renamed in 1966, when several Irish railway stations were renamed as part of the Easter Rising 50th-anniversary celebrations, after the Pearse brothers, Patrick and Willie.  Probably due to confusion with the nearby Pearse Street, Dubliners often refer to it as "Pearse Street station".

Bay platform removal
The bay platforms have been used as a set for movies including Michael Collins, Angela's Ashes, Nora and the 2005 remake Lassie.   Until 2007 the former platform 2 was occasionally used for special services.  The former platform 1 continued to exist but was unsuitable for modern passenger trains and was used as a siding before conversion to a car park.  Platform 5 had also been unused for some time.  By 2008 all the bay platforms had been removed or filled in.

Station renovation
Major renovation commenced in 2007 with publicity erected in the station for this in March 2008.
As part of phase 1, automatic ticket validation machines were installed on platforms 1 and 2.
The front entrance of the station was changed. The former Spar shop was completely taken out of the station and the old ticket barriers were removed. Platforms 3, 4  and 5 were removed. New signage and CCTV cameras were added on both active platforms and, on Platform 2, a larger waiting area for passengers was provided.

An additional Southbound entrance (Pearse Street and Trinity Bio Science) was opened 9 April 2013.  At the official opening of the entrance by Minister Leo Varadkar the National Transport Authority used the term Pearse Street Station in the title of a page on its website although there was no evidence of any official renaming. with other examples of that usage in media elsewhere.

Signalling improvements
The completion of the Irish Rail City Centre Re-signalling Project has seen an increase in the number of Northern and Maynooth line suburban trains stopping. Trains from Newbridge now also serve Pearse station.  This was made possible by increasing the ability of the signalling system in the city centre to operate 20 trains per hour in both directions instead of the previous 8.  The project began in March 2015 and was commissioned on 17 July 2016.

Roof renovations
The roof structure comprises two main sections - the main station area roof has 40 barrelled roof trusses, each spanning 28 metres, over 38 bays, with additional gable end structures at both ends.   Adjacent to the main station roof there is a second similar roof, which covers a car park and station infrastructure area. This is smaller and comprises 19 trusses over 18 bays.

A €10m roof replacement project started in August 2018 and was completed in June 2020.

Pearse Station was closed for 13 weekends over the two years to facilitate the replacement project. During these weekends, northside DART, Maynooth and Drogheda services operated to and from Connolly Station, with southside DART and Rosslare services operating from Grand Canal Dock.

Road transport 
The station is served by a number of Dublin Bus routes, stops for which are located just outside the station on Westland Row and around the corner on Pearse Street.

Other functions 
The station is the headquarters of Iarnród Éireann's DART/Commuter sector.

Proposed underground station
The National Transport Authority proposed a DART Underground connecting Heuston Station to the northern DART network via the Docklands railway station. As part of this project, an underground station would have been constructed beneath Pearse station. The proposed project was shelved in 2011, and, as of 2021, not scheduled for any development or funding until "after 2042".

Gallery

See also
 List of railway stations in Ireland
 Rail transport in Ireland
 History of rail transport in Ireland

Notes and references

Notes

References

External links

 Irish Rail Pearse Station website
 Video explainer of Pearse Roof replacement project
 DART Underground
 Video tour of how Pearse Underground station might appear

Pearse
Iarnród Éireann stations in Dublin (city)
1834 establishments in Ireland
Railway stations in the Republic of Ireland opened in 1834